Anna Germundsdotter or Girmundsdotter (Latin; Anna Germundi, died 23 March 1538) was a Swedish writer and Roman Catholic nun of the Bridgettine order and abbess of the Vadstena Abbey from 1518 until 1529.

Life
Anna Germundsdotter was from Söderköping and the maternal niece of Ingemund Petrusson, Canon (priest) of the Linköping Cathedral. She became a member of the Brigettine order of the Vadstena Abbey in 1489. She was the author of the Codex Holm. A 3, a list documenting the rules of the abbey, from 1502.

In 1518, she was elected abbess by a majority of votes from the monks but a minority of votes from the nuns of the double convent, but the bishop granted her the election victory and had her installed as abbess. She hosted king Christian II of Denmark in 1521.

In circa 1526, the famous scandal about Liten Agda och Olof Tyste was to have taken place at the abbey, and the following year, when the Swedish Reformation was introduced, king Gustav I of Sweden gave instructions to the abbess through Bishop Hans Brask, with reference to the scandalous elopement of the nun Agda, who had been placed in the abbey against her will, with her lover Olof, that no-one should be allowed to become a nun at the abbey in the future without permission from the monarch.   The existing members were also given royal permission to leave the convent if the wished to do so: some of the younger nuns made use of this permit, and the abbess Anna Germundsdotter was forbidden to stop them.

In 1529, two monks and their confessor attended the Örebro Synod, and was noted to have changed their sympathies to the Protestant reformers.  The same year, Anna Germundsdotter chose to resign as abbess and retire as an ordinary member of the convent.

Notes

References
 Syster Patricia, OSsS 2003: ”Vadstena klosters abbedissor”. I: Beskow, Per & Annette Landen (red.) Birgitta av Vadstena. Pilgrim och profet 1303–1373. Natur och Kultur, Stockholm. S. 297–314.
 Historiskt bibliotek utgifvet af Carl Silfverstolpe
 http://www.sofi.se/images/smp/pdf/germund.pdf
 Vadstena klosters minnesbok [microform] Diarium vazstenense (1918)
 http://www.nordlund.lu.se/Fornsvenska/Fsv%20Folder/Person.html

1538 deaths
Year of birth missing
Bridgettine nuns
Swedish Roman Catholic abbesses
16th-century Swedish nuns
16th-century Swedish women writers